Liquid XML Studio IDE is a Windows based XML editor and XML data binding toolkit. It includes graphical editors for authoring XML, XML Schema, WSDL, XSLT and HTML. It also includes user interface extension to Microsoft Visual Studio through the Visual Studio Industry Partner (VSIP) program.

XML editing 
Liquid XML Studio provides features for editing and validating XML documents. The GUI is a multi-document tabbed design and each document can be viewed in a text, graphical or split view. Document validation includes both checking for well formedness against the W3C XML standard and also checking validity against associated W3C XML Schema.

XML data binding 
Liquid XML Studio provides XML data binding code generation through both a graphical Wizard and command line interface. The generated code can be C++, C#, Java, Silverlight, Visual Basic .NET, or Visual Basic 6.

XML data mapper 
Liquid XML Studio provides a graphical data mapping tool to allow data conversion between XML documents with different data shapes using a simple drag and drop interface.

XML differencing tool 
Liquid XML Studio provides an XML aware differencing tool to compare XML documents. The tool is based on the Zhang-Shasha algorithm.

HTML document generation tool 
Liquid XML Studio provides a tool to document an XML Schema as HTML via a graphical Wizard and command line interface. Examples of the output can be found at the XML Standards Schema Library web site.

XML schema library 
Liquid XML Studio automatically downloads and validates XML documents against industry standard XML Schema such as those promoted by the Organization for the Advancement of Structured Information Standards, Financial products Markup Language, and the Open Geospatial Consortium.

Licensing 
The Liquid XML Studio license is proprietary "node locked" or "concurrent user" models.
A Freeware Community Edition is available for Commercial and Non-Commercial use with a restricted feature set.

See also 
 XML editor
 XML data binding
 XML
 XML Schema (W3C)
 WSDL
 XSLT
 HTML
 Visual Studio Industry Partner

External links 
 
 XML Standards Schema Library
 Microsoft Visual Studio Tools Gallery
 XML Data Binding Resources, by Ronald Bourret

XML editors